ESPN is a Dutch group of pay television sports channels, owned by ESPN Inc., a joint venture between The Walt Disney Company (which owns a controlling 80% stake) and the Hearst Communications (which owns the remaining 20%) and operated by Eredivisie Media & Marketing CV in which The Walt Disney Company (Benelux) BV has 51% ownership. ESPN launched as Fox Sports on 1 August 2013, buying out the Eredivisie Live service from the Dutch Football League. On 31 December 2020, it was renamed ESPN after the acquisition of 21st Century Fox by Disney in 2019. ESPN offers 4 HD channels and 1 Ultra HD channel, Video-on-demand services and ESPN app. Its main competitor is the Dutch premium television service Ziggo Sport Totaal.

History
It launched as Eredivisie Live at the start of the 2008–09 season on 29 August 2008.  Highlights of the Eredivisie can be seen on the national public broadcaster NOS.

The pundit team includes Jan van Halst, Mario Been and Pierre van Hooijdonk. Gary Lineker provides a weekly analysis of the matches, which can be seen on the website of Eredivisie Live. The website also offers pay-per-view matches.

Between the 2009–10 and 2012–13 seasons, Eredivisie Live broadcast the UEFA Europa League live on Thursdays. From 2013–14 the coverage switched to sister service Fox Sports International for matches of non-Dutch clubs.

In August 2013, the Eredivisie Media & Marketing CV would establish another two channels which included Fox Sports International while Eredivisie Live was rebranded into Fox Sports Eredivisie on 1 August 2013.

On 20 March 2019 The Walt Disney Company acquired 21st Century Fox, including Fox Networks Group Benelux and Fox's 51% stake on the channel. Since July 2019, Fox Sports 1 is part of the KPN provider basic package. On 1 October 2020, it was announced that the networks would rebrand as ESPN on 31 December 2020, due to the acquisition of 21st Century Fox by Disney.

The number of linear television channels was reduced to 4 on 2 August 2021. ESPN Ultra HD launched on 2 August 2021, During the Johan Cruijff Schaal. This also was Evert ten Napel's last match as ESPN commentator.

Channels
ESPN
ESPN2
ESPN3
ESPN4
ESPN Ultra HD
ESPN Watch (digital app for subscribers)

Coverage

Football
 Eredivisie All games live
 KNVB Cup All games live, with late evening kick-off simulcasted on free-to-air channel FOX
 Keuken Kampioen Divisie at least 2 games per week live with a switch program for all friday games (Voetbal op Vrijdag) (including the friday Eredivisie game)
 Vrouwen Eredivisie Sunday game live
 Johan Cruyff Shield
 UEFA Europa League All games with Dutch teams involved live, selected other games
 UEFA Europa Conference League All games with Dutch teams involved live, selected other games
 CONMEBOL Libertadores
 CONMEBOL Sudamericana
 CONMEBOL Recopa
 Africa Cup of Nations All games live
 2022 FIFA World Cup qualification (CAF)
 MLS

American Football
 NFL
 NCAA College Football
 USFL
 XFL

Baseball
 MLB

Basketball
 NBA 6 games per week live
 NCAA College Basketball

Ice Hockey
 NHL 3 games per week live

See also
 Television in the Netherlands
 ESPN International

References

External links
 ESPN

Netherlands
Television channels in the Netherlands
Television channels and stations established in 2013
2013 establishments in the Netherlands
Eredivisie
Sports television networks